Centaur Bluff is a steep bluff on the eastern side of the Surveyors Range,  west of Mount Canopus. It was named by the New Zealand Geological Survey Antarctic Expedition (1960–61) after the star Centauri, which was frequently used to fix survey stations.

References 

Cliffs of the Ross Dependency
Shackleton Coast